Mona Steigauf (born 17 January 1970 in Starnberg) is a retired German heptathlete.

Her personal best was 6546 points, achieved at the 1997 Summer Universiade in Catania. This ranks her ninth among German heptathletes, behind Sabine Braun, Sabine Paetz, Ramona Neubert, Anke Behmer-Vater, Heike Drechsler, Ines Schulz, Sibylle Thiele and Heike Tischler.

Achievements

References

External links

1970 births
Living people
German heptathletes
Athletes (track and field) at the 1996 Summer Olympics
Olympic athletes of Germany
Universiade medalists in athletics (track and field)
People from Starnberg
Sportspeople from Upper Bavaria
Universiade gold medalists for Germany
Universiade silver medalists for Germany
Medalists at the 1995 Summer Universiade
Medalists at the 1997 Summer Universiade
20th-century German women
21st-century German women